Cabin Ben is a historic log house at 115 Cullasaja Drive in Highlands, North Carolina.  The house consists of two rectangular sections, joined at an offset.  The smaller of the two sections houses a large living room, while the larger section houses the kitchen, dining, and bedroom areas.  The house was designed by Clemson University professor of architecture Rudolph Edward Lee for a family friend, Miss Anne England, and was built in 1932 by Joe Webb, a locally prominent builder of log houses.  It is a relatively unaltered example of Webb's work, having been designed to house relatively large family gatherings.  It has remained in the hands of England descendants.

The house was listed on the National Register of Historic Places in 2003.

See also
National Register of Historic Places listings in Macon County, North Carolina

References

Houses on the National Register of Historic Places in North Carolina
Houses completed in 1932
Houses in Macon County, North Carolina
National Register of Historic Places in Macon County, North Carolina